This table displays the top-rated primetime television series of the 2014–15 season as measured by Nielsen Media Research.

References

2014 in American television
2015 in American television
2014-related lists
2015-related lists
Lists of American television series